The women's heavyweight is a competition featured at the 2015 World Taekwondo Championships, and was held at the Traktor Ice Arena in Chelyabinsk, Russia on May 15 and May 16. Heavyweights were limited to a minimum of 73 kilograms in body mass.

Medalists

Results
DQ — Won by disqualification
R — Won by referee stop contest

Final

Top half

Bottom half

References
Draw
Results

External links
Official website

Women's 74
Worl